Boeing Commercial Airplanes (BCA) is a division of The Boeing Company. It designs, assembles, markets, and sells jet airliners and business jets (Boeing Business Jets), and also provides product-related maintenance and training to customers worldwide. BCA operates out of its division headquarters in Renton, Washington, and has more than a dozen engineering, manufacturing, and assembly facilities located throughout the United States and internationally. It includes the assets of the Douglas Aircraft division of the former McDonnell Douglas Corporation, which merged with Boeing in 1997. As of the end of 2021, BCA employed about 35,926 people.

Organization

Boeing Commercial Airplanes (BCA) is organized as:
 Airplane Programs
 Boeing Renton Factory 737, BBJ
 Boeing Everett Factory 767, 777
 Boeing South Carolina 787
 Fabrication Division
 Global Partners
 Propulsion Systems
 Commercial Aviation Services

BCA subsidiaries:
 Aeroinfo Systems
 Aviall
 Aviation Partners Boeing, a 50/50 joint venture with Aviation Partners Inc.
 Boeing Canada
 Boeing Training & Flight Services (was Alteon Training)
 CDG
 Jeppesen, formerly Jeppesen Sanderson.
 Preston Aviation Solutions

Management 
In November 2016, Boeing announced that Ray Conner would step down immediately as BCA's president and CEO. He was succeeded by Kevin G. McAllister, who was the first outside recruitment in BCA history. McAllister was instructed by Dennis Muilenburg to triple revenue from aftermarket services from $15 billion to a target of $50 billion over 10 years, with a new purpose-built unit headed by Stan Deal. Keith Leverkuhn was the vice president and general manager of the 737 MAX program in March 2017 when it received certification.

McAllister was eventually ousted by Boeing in October 2019, in the midst of a company crisis following two fatal crashes of its 737 MAX jets. Stan Deal succeeded him in both of his positions. One insider called McAllister a "scapegoat" as he had only joined BCA during the later stages of the 737 MAX's development.

Products

Model naming convention

For all models sold beginning with the Boeing 707 in 1957, except the Boeing 720, Boeing's naming system for commercial airliners has taken the form of 7X7 (X representing a number). All model designations from 707 through 787 have been assigned, leaving 797 as the only 7X7 model name not assigned to a product.

For models 707 to 777, the full model number consists of an airplane's model number, for example, 707 or 747, followed by a hyphen and three digits that represent the series within the model, for example, 707-320 or 747-400. In aviation circles, a more specific model designation is sometimes used where the last two digits of the series designator are replaced by the two-digit, alpha-numeric Boeing customer code, for example, 747-121, representing a 747-100 originally ordered by Pan American World Airways (Boeing customer code 21) or 737-7H4, representing a 737-700 originally ordered by Southwest Airlines (Boeing customer code H4). Codes do not change for aircraft transferred from one airline to another. Unlike other models, the 787 uses a single digit to designate the series, for example, 787-8. This convention was followed in the development of the newest version of the 747, the 747-8, along with the 737 MAX and 777X series.

Additional letters are sometimes appended to the model name as a suffix, including "ER" to designate an "extended range" version, such as the 777-300ER, or "LR" to designate a "long range" version, for example 777-200LR. Other suffix designators include "F" for "freighter" (747-400F), "C" for "convertible" aircraft that can be converted between a passenger and freighter configuration (727-100C), "SR" or "D" for "short range" and "domestic" (747-400D, 747SR), and "M" for "combi" aircraft that are configured to carry both passengers and freight at the same time (757-200M, 747-400M). Passenger aircraft that are originally manufactured as passenger aircraft and later converted to freighter configuration by Boeing carry the suffix "BCF" designating a Boeing converted freighter (747-400BCF).

Aircraft in production or development

Orders and deliveries
The table below lists only airliners from the jet era.

Data from Boeing through end of December 2021

Discontinued aircraft

Gallery

Specialty and other aircraft
Airlines commonly order aircraft with special features or options, but Boeing builds certain models specifically for a particular customer.
 The Boeing 707-138B was a shortened-fuselage, long-range model only sold to Qantas.
 The Boeing 757-200M was a single-example model built for Royal Nepal Airlines (now called Nepal Airlines). This plane could be converted between passenger and freighter configuration. It was launched by Royal Nepal Airlines in 1986 and delivered two years later.
 Boeing 747 
 The Shuttle Carrier Aircraft
 The Boeing 747 Large Cargo Freighter (named the Dreamlifter) is a wide-body cargo aircraft.
 The 747SP production resumed nearly four years after the supposedly final 747SP was built, to manufacture one aircraft for the United Arab Emirates. It had a cockpit crew of two instead of the three-crew layout of other 747SPs.
 Two Boeing VC-25s were built for the US Air Force as Presidential Air Force One transports. This model was a highly modified 747-200B.
 Four Boeing 747-100SRs were built for Japan Airlines for a domestic flight service.
 Nine Boeing 747-100Bs were built for Iran Air and Saudi Arabian Airlines, which had a stronger airframe and landing gear, as well as an increased fuel capacity.
 Boeing was a consultant to Sukhoi on the Russian Regional Jet program that subsequently became the Sukhoi Superjet 100 twin-engine narrowbody airliner.

Concepts
 Boeing 2707 – supersonic airliner, canceled
 Boeing 7J7 – high-efficiency propfan airliner, canceled 
 Boeing 747-300 Trijet – high-efficiency trijet version of the Boeing 747-200, canceled
 Boeing 777-100/777 trijet – the original proposed version of the Boeing 777
 Boeing New Large Airplane – double-deck jumbo airliner, canceled
 Boeing New Midsize Airplane – targeting the middle of the market segment
 Boeing RC-1 – cargo aircraft, canceled
 Boeing Sonic Cruiser – near-sonic airliner, canceled
 Boeing Liquid Hydrogen (LH2) airplane that uses liquid hydrogen as fuel
 Hypersonic Airliner Concept. Mach 5 speed
 Boeing 747-500 - larger ultra-haul version of the Boeing 747

Airfoils
 Boeing 103 - used on Model 40 and F2B
 Boeing 103A - used on F2B and F3B
 Boeing 106 - used on Model 80, P-12, Monomail, Model 226
 Boeing 106B - used on Model 95, Model 247D, P-12
 Boeing 106R - used on various Beriev models
 Boeing 109 - used on Model 95 and P-26
 Boeing 117 - used on XPBB, B-29 and derivatives (307, 367, 377), all Aero Spacelines models, Tupolev Tu-4, Tu-70, Tu-75, Tu-80.

Major facilities 
 Long Beach, California - Former McDonnell Douglas aircraft assembly, currently supports Boeing Commercial Airplanes
 Seattle - Puget Sound region, Washington
Boeing Field, Seattle - Final delivery of 737, flight testing of all aircraft
 Boeing Everett Factory, Everett - 767 and 777 production and final assembly plant
 Boeing Renton Factory, Renton - 737 production and final assembly plant
 Boeing South Carolina, North Charleston, South Carolina - 787 production and final assembly plant

See also

 Airbus
 Bombardier Aerospace
 Comac
 Competition between Airbus and Boeing
 Embraer
 List of civil aircraft
 United Aircraft Corporation

References

External links
 Boeing Commercial Airplanes page
 BCA Recent orders summary page and BCA Orders and Deliveries report page
 Official site for Boeing's new airplanes
 Complete production list starting with Model 1
 Boeing’s Triumph: The American Jetliner
 BBC Q&A: Boeing and Airbus

Boeing
Aerospace companies of the United States
Companies based in Renton, Washington
Manufacturing companies based in Washington (state)
Collier Trophy recipients